The 2009 Auto Club 500 was the second race of the 2009 NASCAR Sprint Cup season. the  race occurred on February 22, 2009, at the  Auto Club Speedway in Fontana, California,  from Los Angeles and was one of the cleanest races in the history of the track with only one caution for an on track incident out of all 250 laps. Fox broadcast the race beginning at 5 pm US EST with radio coverage on MRN (terrestrial) and Sirius XM Radio (satellite) starting at 5:15 pm US EST.  The race started at 3 pm local time, and run into prime time, counterprogramming against the Academy Awards.

Entry list

Qualifying

Race recap
Capitol Records Nashville recording artists Little Big Town performed the National Anthem and actor Hugh Laurie gave the command to start engines.

Brian Vickers (the polesitter), Michael Waltrip (42nd), David Reutimann (7th); Dale Earnhardt Jr. (35th), and Reed Sorenson (17th) started from the back due to changes in the engine and the transmissions.

Actress Angie Harmon waved the green flag as Jamie McMurray started in first place, but was passed by Jimmie Johnson on the backstretch for the lead. The first caution came out on lap 5; a light rain shower over turn 4. Ryan Newman's transponder was malfunctioning and had to go to pit road for repair. After leaving the pits. the left endplate of the rear spoiler on Newman's car fell off. Newman, again, came down pit road for repairs. VIckers reported his car's carburetor had stopped working a few times under caution. On lap 17, Earnhardt Jr.; Joey Logano, Dave Blaney and others stopped for fuel. The field restarted on lap 23 with Jimmie Johnson in the lead, followed by McMurray, Jeff Gordon and brothers Kurt and Kyle Busch.

Since the restart, in 13 laps, defending Daytona 500 winner Matt Kenseth moved up to 11th position from 20th position; David Ragan ran in 7th from the 19th position. Joe Nemechek made his way to pit road where his crew then pushed the car to the garage on lap 37. The second caution came out on lap 41 due to light rain. Drivers start their first round of pit stops; Ku. Busch and Jimmie Johnson  switched positions for first and second, Ragan gained five positions, and teammate Kenseth gained 7 positions on pit road. Sorenson was too fast entering and exiting pit road, served a drive thru penalty. Restart on lap 47.

Johnson edged ahead of Ku. Busch to the start-finish line for the lead after the restart. Blaney entered pit road with no power on lap 50. Lap 67, Johnson continued to lead laps; Scott Riggs headed to the garage, becoming the third driver to do so after Blaney and Nemechek; he returned to the track, 8 laps down, in 41st. Gordon led his first lap in the race on lap 78. Drivers Casey Mears, Jeff Burton, John Andretti, Logano, Scott Speed, and Jeremy Mayfield went a lap down when Gordon took the lead. Lap 85, second round of pitstops. Teammates Greg Biffle and Carl Edwards each led a lap during the round of pitstops.

On lap 119, drivers began their third round of pitstops. Gordon remained the leader until Biffle's crew completed the pit stop quicker than Gordon's crew during the pitstop round; no pit road penalties were served. Biffle led an additional 13 laps until the yellow flag waved on lap 140 because of light rain; Michael Waltrip gets the 'lucky dog' free pass. Drivers entered pit road with Biffle in the lead. Kenseth gained three positions for the lead (4th to 1st), Biffle lost a position (1st to 2nd), Johnson lost two positions (4th to 6th), and Harvick gained two positions (12th to 10th) after completing their stops. Montoya stayed on the track and led a lap before he entered pit road.

The field restarted with Kenseth in the lead, Biffle in 2nd, Gordon in third, Ku. Busch in 4th, and Johnson in 5th on lap 151. Teammates Johnson and Gordon battled for 2nd as Kenseth pulled away and led laps. David Ragan, who stood in 19th and was a lap down, reported an overheating engine on lap 161. Speed entered pit road reporting with no power before the fourth caution on lap 169, again due to rain. Vickers, in 18th place, got the lucky dog free pass. Hendrick Motorsports drivers Johnson, Martin, Earnhardt Jr. reported problems on the same lap. In the fourth round of pitstops, Johnson gained 3 positions (5th to 2nd), Gordon lost a position (2nd to 3rd), Biffle lost three positions (6th to 9th), Hamlin gained one position (8th to 7th), Edwards lost three positions (7th to 10th). Robby Gordon was too fast exiting pit road; Robby Gordon was served a drive through penalty. Stewart stayed out as did Montoya, Martin, Stremme, and Reutimann. After leading three laps, Stewart and others entered the pits handling over the lead to Mark Martin before Martin entered pit road.

The field restarted with Kenseth, Johnson, Gordon, and brothers Kurt and Kyle Busch in the top five on lap 176. Earnhardt Jr. restarted in 17th after engine repairs. Mark Martin's engine blew out of turn 2 after the restart. Martin coasted the car to pit road; no caution. Running in 10th, Jaime McMurray reported concerns on his brakes on lap 189. Jeff Gordon and Matt Kenseth battled for the lead with 55 laps to go; Gordon retook the lead, leading lap 195. Kenseth, then, fell back to third behind teammate Greg Biffle. Earnhardt Jr. drove his car to the garage, like teammate Martin, because of engine problems on lap 206.

Harvick, running in 12th, lost the engine, hit and slid across the outside wall between turn one and two on lap 207, ending a streak of 81 races running at the finish. It was also the first time Harvick got a DNF with Shell-Pennzoil sponsorship. Fifth caution of the race; Kasey Kahne got the 'lucky dog' pass. During the pitstop round, Kenseth moved up two positions (3rd to 1st), Gordon lost a position (1st to 2nd), Hamlin and Kurt Busch gained two spots, Steward and Vickers moved up three spots, Biffle lost nine positions, and McMurray lost three positions. Biffle lost nine spots because he ran over the air hose. David Stremme stayed out and led three laps. Kenseth, Gordon, Kyle Busch, Hamlin, and Kurt Busch, in the top five, restart the field on lap 215. The drivers in the top five positions remained unchanged until lap 242 when Hamlin and Kurt Busch switched positions. Aric Almirola, a lap down, slowed on the backstretch; no caution. Kenseth held off a hard-charging Gordon for his 18th win.

Kenseth was the second driver to win the first two races in a season (Gordon in 1997) and the fourth driver to win both the Daytona 500 and the following race (Cale Yarborough in 1977, Richard Petty in 1973). Gordon, Ky. Busch, Biffle, and Ku. Busch made up the Top 5. Vickers, after starting from the back, finished in 10th place. Rookie Logano was in 26th place, a lap down. Earnhardt Jr., because of engine problems, was in 39th, 45 laps down, finishing ahead of teammate Martin who also had engine problems.

Race results

Point standings after the race
Jeff Gordon jumped 10 positions in the standings from 12th to 2nd. Greg Biffle moved from 20th to 5th . Carl Edwards was in 9th from 18th. Kyle Busch moved up 20 positions from 38th to 18th. Jimmie Johnson was in 19th from 31st. Brian Vickers moved up 14 spots from 40th. Travis Kvapil, was in 30th from 42nd.

Elliott Sadler dropped 6 spots from 5th. A.J. Allmendinger lost 10 positions from 3rd. Kevin Harvick dropped from 2nd to 16th. Martin Truex Jr. dropped 7 positions to 17th. Mark Martin lost 12 spots from 15th to 27th. Dale Earnhardt Jr. lost 9 spots from the 26th place in the point standings.

References 

Auto Club 500
Auto Club 500
Auto Club 500
NASCAR races at Auto Club Speedway